Frank Norris (1870–1902) was an American journalist and novelist.

Frank Norris may also refer to:
Frank Norris (bishop) (1864–1945), Anglican missionary bishop
Frank Norris (footballer) (1869–1934), English footballer with Preston North End and Darlington
J. Frank Norris (1877–1952), Baptist preacher and Christian fundamentalist
Sir Frank Kingsley Norris (1893–1984), Australian military officer and physician